Yelena Valeryevna Bogomazova (born 9 February 1982) is a Russian swimmer who won 13 medals in breaststroke at the European Championships of 2002–2007 and a bronze medal at the 2000 FINA World Swimming Championships (25 m). She also competed at the 2004 and 2008 Summer Olympics, but did not reach the finals.

She retired from swimming after the 2008 Olympics. Before that, she lived and trained in France and was planning to obtain a university degree there.

References

External links 
 

1982 births
Living people
Swimmers at the 2004 Summer Olympics
Swimmers at the 2008 Summer Olympics
Russian female breaststroke swimmers
Russian female swimmers
Olympic swimmers of Russia
Medalists at the FINA World Swimming Championships (25 m)
European Aquatics Championships medalists in swimming
Universiade medalists in swimming
Universiade bronze medalists for Russia
Medalists at the 2001 Summer Universiade